is a Japanese bureaucrat, business leader, and politician. He was elected governor of Okinawa Prefecture in 2006.

Biography 
Nakaima was born on August 19, 1939 in Higashinari Ward of Osaka. He is of Ryukyuan descent. Nakaima is descended from a Chinese family with the surname of Cai, one of the 36 Han Chinese Kumemura families who moved to Okinawa in 1392. In 1945 during World War II, his family escaped from the air raids in Osaka and evacuated to Meiji, Minamiamabe District, Oita Prefecture. In 1946 he returned to his parents' hometown of Naha, Okinawa. There he graduated from Kainan Elementary School, Uenoyama Junior High School, and Naha Senior High School. Nakaima excelled in math and science, earning grades that placed him at the top of his class.

Pursuing a dream of becoming an automobile designer, Nakaima sat for an exam to apply for the Government-funded/Self-funded Okinawa Student Program, a system established between the United States Military Government in Okinawa and the Japanese Government to allow students from Okinawa to attend university in mainland Japan. Nakaima passed the exam and matriculated at the University of Tokyo, where he graduated with a Bachelor of Engineering degree in 1961.

Directly after graduating in 1961, Nakaima joined the Ministry of International Trade and Industry (MITI). In the 1980s, Nakaima served as the Director General of the Commerce and Industry Department at the Okinawa General Bureau and later as the Deputy Director-General for Technology Affairs at MITI's Agency of Industrial Science and Technology.

In 1987, Nakaima took a Senior General Manager position with the Okinawa Electric Power Company. In 1990, he left the company to become a Vice Governor in the administration of Okinawa Governor Masahide Ota. Nakaima returned to the Okinawa Electric Power Company in 1995, serving as the company's President and later Chairman of the Board of Directors.

In 2006 the Liberal Democratic Party and the New Kōmeitō gave him backing for his run in the Okinawa gubernatorial election on November 19. In the election, Nakaima defeated Keiko Itokazu, who received the recommendation of five opposition parties. Nakaima assumed the office of Governor on December 10, 2006.  He was re-elected for a second term on November 28, 2010, defeating Yoichi Iha.

In December 2013, Nakaima approved a landfill proposal by the Japanese government to permit the construction of new military facilities in Henoko to replace Marine Corps Air Station Futenma. The decision came two days after Tokyo earmarked 348 billion yen for Okinawa's economic development and despite earlier campaign promises by Nakaima to move the base outside of the prefecture altogether.

On May 10, 2014, Nakaima sent his congratulations to the openly revisionist lobby Nippon Kaigi for a sport event it held in Okinawa

Nakaima lost his bid for a second re-election on November 16, 2014, losing to former Naha mayor Takeshi Onaga. Onaga opposed the plan to move the Marine Corps Air Station Futenma base to Henoko Bay, while Nakaima supported it.

See also 
 University of Tokyo
 Ministry of International Trade and Industry
 Masahide Ota

References

External links 
  Hirokazu Nakaima Supporters' Association 
  Okinawa Prefecture, Governor's Webpage
 Okinawa Electric Power Company, Incorporated

1939 births
Living people
People from Osaka
University of Tokyo alumni
Members of Nippon Kaigi
Governors of Okinawa Prefecture
Japanese people of Chinese descent
Ryukyuan people
Japanese politicians of Ryukyuan descent